Riku Misora (海空りく, Misora Riku, born January 19, 1987) is a Japanese novelist.

Overview 
Misora debuted with his series Danzai no Exceed (断罪のイクシード) when the first novel won the 2nd GA Bunko Awards Award of Excellence under the name Zeni no Mahō (善意の魔法). His series, Chivalry of a Failed Knight and High School Prodigies Have It Easy Even In Another World, ⁣both received anime adaptations in 2015 and 2019 respectively.

Works

Novels 

 Danzai no Exceed (断罪のイクシード) (Illustrated by Keīchi Sumi, published by GA Bunko, 5 volumes, 2010 - 2012)
 Kanojo no Koi ga Hanashitekurenai! (彼女の恋が放してくれない) (Illustrated by Satoru Arikawa, published by GA Bunko, 3 volumes, 2012 - 2013)
 Chivalry of a Failed Knight (落第騎士の英雄譚, Rakudai Kishi no Eiyūtan) (Illustrated by Won, published by GA Bunko, 18 volumes, 2013 -)
 Ultimate Antihero (アルティメット・アンチヒーロー) (Illustrated by Nardack, published by Kodansha, 4 volumes, 2014 - 2016)
 High School Prodigies Have It Easy Even In Another World (超人高校生たちは異世界でも余裕で生き抜くようです!, Chōjin-Kōkōseitachi wa Isekai demo Yoyu de Ikinuku Yōdesu!) (Illustrated by Sacraneco, published by GA Bunko, 10 volumes, 2015 - 2020)
 I Kissed My Girlfriend's Little Sister?! (カノジョの妹とキスをした。, Kanojo no Imōto to Kiss o Shita) (Illustrated by Sabamizore, published by GA Bunko, 4 volumes, 2020 - 2022)

Manga 

 Yakyū de Sensōsuru Isekai de Chokōkōkyū S ga Jyakushōkokka o Sukūyō desu (野球で戦争する異世界で超高校級エースが弱小国家を救うようです。) (Illustrated by Takuya Nishida, published by Monthly Shōnen Sirius, 2 volumes, 2021 -)

References

External links 

 
 海空りく - pixiv

Living people
1987 births
Japanese novelists
Light novelists